Qoroq may refer to:
Qoroq-e Qavamcheh, Fars Province
Qoroq, Gilan
Qoroq, Golestan
Qoroq Aqa, Isfahan Province
Qoroq, Kurdistan
Qoroq, Lorestan
Qoroq, Amol, Mazandaran Province
Qoroq, Sari, Mazandaran Province
Qoroq, Razavi Khorasan
Qoroq, Yazd
Qoroq, alternate name of Zir-e Bagh-e Shah, Yazd Province
Qoroq Rural District